KRAV may refer to:

 KRAV-FM, a radio station (96.5 FM) licensed to Tulsa, Oklahoma, United States
 KRAV (agriculture), a Swedish label for organic farming
 Kapap, Krav Panim El Panim self-defense system
 Krav Maga, an Israeli self-defense system